Nephrurus sheai, also known commonly as the Kimberley rough knob-tailed gecko and the northern knob-tailed gecko, is a species of lizard in the family Carphodactylidae. The species is endemic to Australia.

Etymology
The specific name, sheai, is in honor of Australian herpetologist Glenn Michael Shea (born 1961).

Geographic range
N. sheai is found in Northern Territory and Western Australia.

Habitat
The preferred natural habitats of N. sheai are dry caves, rocky areas, and forest.

Diet
N. sheai is known to prey upon Lepidopteran larvae (caterpillars), Isoptera  (termites), and Gastropoda (land snails).

Reproduction
N. sheai is oviparous.

References

Further reading
Cogger HG (2014). Reptiles and Amphibians of Australia, Seventh Edition. Clayton, Victoria, Australia: CSIRO Publishing. xxx + 1,033 pp. . (Nephrurus sheai, p. 267).
Couper PJ, Gregson RAM (1994). "Redescription of Nephrurus asper Günther, and description of N. amyae sp. nov. and N. sheai sp. nov." Memoirs of the Queensland Museum 37 (1):  53–67. ("Nephrurus sheai Couper", new species, pp. 63–66, Figure 5).
Ellis RJ, Doughty P, Bauer AM (2018). "An annotated type catalogue of the geckos and pygopods (Squamata: Gekkota: Carphodactylidae, Diplodactylidae, Gekkonidae, Pygopodidae) in the collection of the Western Australian Museum". Records of the Western Australian Museum 33: 51–94. (Nephrurus sheai, pp. 55–56).
Oliver PM, Bauer AM (2011). "Systematics and evolution of the Australian knob-tailed geckos (Nephrurus, Carphodactylidae, Gekkota): Plesiomorphic grades and biome shifts through the Miocene". Molecular Phylogenetics and Evolution 59: 664–674. 
Wilson S, Swan G (2013). A Complete Guide to Reptiles of Australia, Fourth Edition. Sydney: New Holland Publishers. 522 pp. .

Geckos of Australia
Nephrurus
Reptiles described in 1994
Taxa named by Patrick J. Couper